Johann Jakob Schmauss (10 March 1690 - 8 April 1757) was a German jurist, historian, and university professor.

Biography 
Johann Jakob Schmauss was born in Landau. After attending school in Durlach and Stuttgart, he studied at the University of Strasbourg and the University of Halle, where he fell under the influence of Christian Thomasius and Nicolaus Hieronymus Gundling. He obtained his Habilitation in 1712, qualifying him to hold lectures in history. At this time Schmauss began regularly publishing journals. Without limiting his literary activities, in 1721 he joined the service of the Margrave of Baden-Durlach, first as a councilor. In 1722 he published Corpus juris publici Germanici academicum, the first clear guide to imperial public law; the study went through seven editions by 1794. On 29 April 1734, Schmauss held the chair of Natural Law (historiarum et juris naturae et gentium) in Göttingen. After he accepted a call to return to Halle, where he held an equivalent post, and briefly taught at Leipzig, but in 1744, he returned again to his previous position at Göttingen, where he remained until his death.

Works 
In Latin
Corpus juris publici Germanici academicum, Leipzig, 1722.
 
Dissertationes juris naturalis quibus principia nom systematis hujus juris ex ipsis naturœ humanœ instinctibus extruendi proponuntur, Göttingen, 1742, in-8°.
Compendium juris publici, 1746.

In German
 
 
 
 
J. J. Schmaußens akademische Reden und Vorlesungen über das Teutsche Staatsrecht, 1766 (posthumous).

In French
Nouveau système du droit de la nature, 1745, in-8°, 1754.

References 

1690 births
1757 deaths
Jurists from Rhineland-Palatinate
University of Strasbourg alumni
Martin Luther University of Halle-Wittenberg alumni